Dasim is one of the five sons of Iblis, mentioned in tafsir. (attributed to Muslim ibn al-Hajjaj) He is a devil, linked to the cause of hatred between man and wife. His four brothers are named: Awar (اعور or لأعوار), Zalambur (زلنبور), Sut (مسوط), and Tir (ثبر). Each of them is linked to another psychological function, which they try to encourage to prevent humans spiritual development.

References

Demons in Islam